Darbyville is an unincorporated community in Appanoose County, Iowa, United States.

History
Darbyville was centered on a coal mine that closed in 1901, after it accidentally flooded. A post office was established in Darbyville in 1891, and remained in operation until it was discontinued in 1910.

References

Unincorporated communities in Appanoose County, Iowa
1891 establishments in Iowa
Unincorporated communities in Iowa